The Rural Municipality of North Qu'Appelle No. 187 is a rural municipality (RM) in the Canadian province of Saskatchewan within Census Division No. 6 and  Division No. 1. It is located in the south-east portion of the province.

History 
The RM of North Qu'Appelle No. 187 incorporated as a rural municipality on December 12, 1910.

Geography

Communities and localities 
The following urban municipalities are surrounded by the RM.

Towns
 Fort Qu'Appelle

Villages
 Lebret

Resort villages
 B-Say-Tah
 Fort San

The following unincorporated communities are within the RM.

Organized hamlets
 Pasqua Lake
 Taylor Beach

Localities
 Katepwa South
 Lake View Beach

Several First Nations Indian reserves are adjacent to RM of North Qu'Appelle.

Lakes and Rivers
The Qu'Appelle River travels through the heart of the RM of North Qu'Appelle. Along the course of this section of the river are the four Fishing Lakes, Pasqua, Echo, Mission, and Katepwa. At the western end of the RM is a fifth lake that is sometimes referred to as one of the Fishing Lakes, Lake Muscowpetung.

Demographics 

Government 
The RM of North Qu'Appelle No. 187 is governed by an elected municipal council and an appointed administrator that meets on the second and fourth Tuesday of every month. The reeve of the RM is Lee Carlson while its administrator is Dawn Lugrin. The RM's office is located in Fort Qu'Appelle.

Transportation 
Rail
Swan River - Preeceville - Melville - Regina Branch C.N.R—serves  Melville, Colmer, Duff, Finnie, Lorlie, Gillespie, Balcarres, Hugonard, Lebret, Fort Qu'Appelle, Muscow, Edgeley, Avonhurst, Edewold, Frankslake, Zehner, Victoria Plains, Regina.

Roads
Highway 56—serves Lebret
Highway 10—serves Fort Qu'Appelle
Highway 20
Highway 35—serves Fort Qu'Appelle
Highway 22—intersects with Saskatchewan Highway 35

See also 
List of rural municipalities in Saskatchewan

References 

 
North Qu'Appelle
Rural Muni